The Forest Rangers is a Canadian television series that ran from 1963 to 1965. It was a co-production between CBC Television and ITC Entertainment and was Canada's first television show produced in colour. Executive producer Maxine Samuels founded the show.

The series ran for three seasons, a total of 104 30-minute colour episodes (although Canadian and UK audiences would not get to see them in colour until long after the series ended). Early episodes of the series were broadcast in serialized form as part of a CBC children's series entitled Razzle Dazzle, hosted by Alan Hamel and Michelle Finney.

This was the first appearance in a major series by Gordon Pinsent. He left the series in 1965 to star in Quentin Durgens, M.P.. In 1966 the series was adapted into a comic strip by British comics artist John Gillatt, which appeared in the British comic magazine Tiger.

The show was also run in syndication in the United States from 1965-1966.

In June 2004, there was a reunion for ex-cast and fans just south of Kleinburg, where the show was originally filmed. Six of the ex-junior rangers appeared and Peter Tully flew in from his home in Ireland. Another reunion occurred 15 June 2013 at the actual studios where the show was filmed. This time nine junior rangers and Gordon Pinsent were in attendance.

The show's first season was released on DVD by Imavision in early 2007.

Main cast

 Graydon Gould as Chief Ranger George Keeley
 Rex Hagon as Junior Ranger Peter Keeley
 Michael Zenon as Joe Two Rivers
 Gordon Pinsent as Sergeant Scott
 Rolland Bédard as Uncle Raoul La Roche
 Ralph Endersby as Junior Ranger Chub Stanley
 Peter Tully as Junior Ranger Mike Forbes
 Susan Conway as Junior Ranger Kathy
 Syme Jago as Junior Ranger Gaby La Roche
 Joe Austin as MacLeod
 Eric Clavering as Shingwauk
 Tom Harvey as Deputy Ranger Brody
 Eric Cryderman as Ranger Matt Craig
 Ronald Cohoon as Junior Ranger Zeke
 George Allan as Junior Ranger Ted
 Mathew Ferguson as Junior Ranger Danny Bailey
 Barbara Hamilton as Aggie Apple
 Gerard Parkes as Charlie Appleby/Michael Flynn
 Ray Bellew as Rocky Webb
 Trudy Young as Wilhelmina

Episode list
There are two episode order lists. This episode list is in sequence by filming date order. The other list is in sequence by episode title order. Some episodes were given different titles on film to those given in the TV guides of different countries.

Filming locations

 Cinespace Film Studios, Kleinburg, Ontario- the main studio lot
 Lake Muskoka- winter lake scenes from season 3
 Widdifield Fire Tower in North Bay, Ontario- fire tower scenes from season 3
 Trout Mills, Ontario- winter lake plane landing from season 1
 Mono Mills, Ontario- an old mill used in season 1
 Dorset Fire Tower in Dorset, Ontario- opening credits scene 
 Mary Lake in King City, Ontario- summer lake scenes from season 1
 Draper Fire Tower in Bracebridge, Ontario- fire tower scenes from season 1
 Whitney, Ontario- river rapids scenes from season 2
 Tottenham, Ontario- a railroad scene from season 1
 King Creek, Ontario in King Township, Ontario- Dog Catcher chase scenes
 Orangeville, Ontario- the rural airport where Charlie Appleby lands his plane from season 2
 Dickie Lake near Baysville, Ontario- summer lake fly-over scene from season 1
 Echo Lake near Baysville, Ontario- summer lake fly-over scene from season 2

References

External links

 
 Queen's University Directory of CBC Television Series (The Forest Rangers archived listing link via archive.org)
 
 tvdb list of episodes

1960s Canadian children's television series
1963 Canadian television series debuts
1965 Canadian television series endings
1960s Canadian drama television series
CBC Television original programming
Television series by ITC Entertainment
ITV children's television shows
Northern Ontario in fiction
Television shows filmed in Ontario
Television shows set in Ontario
Television shows adapted into comics